Benderli Pasha may refer to:

 Benderli Ali Pasha (died 1821), Ottoman grand vizier (1821)
 "Benderli" Mehmed Selim Pasha (1771–1831), Ottoman grand vizier (1824–28)

See also
 Bender, Moldova ("Benderli" means "from Bender" in Turkish)
 Pasha (title)